Searching Through That Minor Key is a 2015 album by Nicholas Altobelli.

Track listing

Personnel

Musicians
 Nicholas Altobelli - vocals, acoustic guitars
 Salim Nourallah - bass, keyboards, backing vocals
 John Dufilho - drums, percussion
 Rahim Quazi - keyboards, piano
 Joe Reyes - electric guitars
 Paul Slavens - accordion, piano, bells, keyboards
 Laura Scarborough - bells, vibraphone
 Chris Holt - acoustic guitar
 Trey Carmichael - drums
 Jonathan Eisenzoph - cello
 Kim Nall - backing vocals

Production
Salim Nourallah – producer, engineer, mixer
Dave Willingham – mastering
Nicholas Altobelli & Marianne Reed – photography
Trey Carmichael – design
Miranda Vinning - artwork

References 

2015 albums